Brigadier John Edward Bruce Smedley  (born 1946), formerly Private Secretary to TRH The Earl and Countess of Wessex, is Chairman of The International Golf Charity and International Golf for Youth Ltd.

Life
John Smedley was educated at Felsted School, where he was a scholar and head boy. He read economics at the University of Reading before being commissioned into the Royal Tank Regiment as one of the first university cadets. All his regimental service was with 3rd Royal Tank Regiment, the Armoured Farmers, mainly in Germany with tours in Northern Ireland and Cyprus.  He was ADC to Lieutenant General Sir Allan Taylor, and did staff tours in Hong Kong in the Gurkha Brigade and in the Ministry of Defence. After attending the Joint Service Defence College at Greenwich he was Commander UNFICYP Support Regiment and then returned to the staff at HQ British Army of the Rhine (BAOR) as Chief G3 Training.  On promotion to colonel he became Assistant Chief of Staff G4 HQ BAOR for a year, then Commander Armoured Recce HQ ACE Rapid Reaction Corps (ARRC) for year, before becoming the last Chief of Staff of the Army Staff College at Camberley. On promotion to brigadier he became Deputy Commander HQ 1st (UK) Armoured Division in Germany.

On retirement from the Army he became Private Secretary to TRH The Earl and Countess of Wessex from January 2002 until April 2014, and again from November 2018 until April 2019. He is Chairman The International Golf Charity and International Golf for Youth Ltd, Chairman Chitterne Cricket Club, a Freeman of the Worshipful Company of Haberdashers, and remains Equerry to TRH The Earl and Countess of Wessex.

He married Lavinia Lane in 1976 and two sons

He was appointed Lieutenant of the Royal Victorian Order in the 2010 New Year Honours, and Commander of the Royal Victorian Order on 13 March 2014.

Footnotes

1946 births
Living people
People educated at Felsted School
Alumni of the University of Reading
Members of the British Royal Household
Royal Tank Regiment officers
Commanders of the Royal Victorian Order